Nutbush City Limits is a studio album by Ike & Tina Turner released on United Artist Records in 1973. The album is noted for the hit single "Nutbush City Limits" which became a staple in their live shows.

Recording and release 
Nutbush City Limits was recorded at Ike & Tina Turner's Bolic Sound studio between June and September 1973. Five of the ten tracks on the album were written by Tina Turner, including "Nutbush City Limits" which peaked at No. 11 on Billboard Hot Soul Singles, No. 22 on the Billboard Hot 100, and No. 4 on the UK Singles Chart. She wrote the song "Club Manhattan" as an ode to the Manhattan Club, the nightclub where she met Ike Turner in East St. Louis, Illinois.

The album includes a different version of their classic song "River Deep – Mountain High," which was released as a single in France. The song "Make Me Over" was re-recorded by Tina and re-titled "Tina's Wish" for the 1993 soundtrack album What's Love Got To Do With It.

The album peaked at No. 21 on the Billboard Soul LP chart and No. 163 on the Top LPs.

Critical reception 
The album received positive critical reception. Billboard reviewed it as "simply the best thought-out Ike & Tina album in many moons." Cash Box noted that "this album is one of the best dance LPs of the year and features Tina's singing at its best as well as lke's capable leadership."

Record World (December 1, 1973): "The title cut is a big single for the torrid Turners and they have filled out their new album with plenty of red hot rock and soul on songs like 'River Deep, Mountain High,' 'Drift Away,' 'Club Manhattan' and 'Make Me Over.' Ike's production is so hot you'll need an asbestos needle."

Reissues 
The album was reissued by Raven Records on the compilation CD Nutbush City Limits/Feel Good in 2006.

Track listing

Chart performance

Certifications

References 

1973 albums
Ike & Tina Turner albums
Albums produced by Ike Turner
United Artists Records albums
Albums recorded at Bolic Sound
Rock albums by American artists
Soul albums by American artists